is a 2021 Japanese animated film produced by Production I.G and Signal.MD, based on the Taiwanese mobile rhythm game Deemo developed by Rayark. It was released theatrically in Japan in February 2022.

Synopsis
The titular Deemo is a mysterious character that plays the piano in a castle. One day, amnesiac girl Alice (Ayana Taketatsu) comes falling from the sky, which starts the story of the two of them, the castle inhabitants, and a tree that grows with the sound of the piano.

Cast

Production
Game developer Rayark announced that Deemo would receive an animated adaptation in November 2019. The film would be animated by Production I.G and Signal.MD, and directed by Shūhei Matsushita, with Junichi Fujisaku serving as executive director and Mebachi as character designer.

The theme song is titled "Nocturne" (stylized in all lowercase), composed by Yuki Kajiura and performed by Hinano Takashima. Takashima was selected through a worldwide audition of 1400 participants that took place from January to July 2020, with the final round being broadcast as part of the Anime Expo Lite 2020 online event on July 4.

Ayana Taketatsu was the first voice actress announced to take part in the film, continuing her performance in Deemo: Last Recital as the voice of main character Alice. In March 2021, it was announced at the AnimeJapan 2021 virtual event that Akari Nibu of Hinatazaka46 would voice the Masked Lady. In July, Ayane Sakura and Akari Kitō was announced to have also joined the cast at the Anime Expo Lite 2021; the official English title of the film, Deemo: Memorial Keys, was also announced at the same event. Five more cast members were announced in October.

The film was Nibu and Kōhei Matsushita's first major voice acting role. Despite this, Fujisaku decided to treat Nibu "equally" and raised his expectations of her, while Taketatsu commented that Nibu's performance did not "feel like that of a first-timer". Meanwhile, Matsushita consulted "word by word" with the director on producing a voice which would fit the film's world, and also drew from his experience as a pianist.

Release 
Deemo: Memorial Keys was first screened at the 23rd Bucheon International Animation Film Festival on October 22, 2021. It was released theatrically in Japan on February 25, 2022, Thailand on March 17, and Taiwan on March 25.

On June 4, 2022, American distribution company Eleven Arts announced that it has obtained the distribution license for Deemo: Memorial Keys. The film will be released in select U.S. theaters on February 2, 2023.

Reception 
Yuichi Shigeta of IGN commented that Deemo: Memorial Keys is generally respectful to the source material and would satisfy both newcomers and fans of the game, although it would not exceed the expectations of the latter. The flow of storytelling was considered reminiscent of the game despite the differences in media, and the addition of original characters does not interfere with the main storyline. While the animation is not very "adventurous", he recommended the film to be watched in theaters to enjoy the music to the fullest.

Accolades

References

External links
 
 

2021 anime films
Anime films based on video games
Anime films composed by Yuki Kajiura
Production I.G
Signal.MD